Paul Oberman (born 28 June 1969) is an Australian former water polo player who competed in the 1992 Summer Olympics.

References

1969 births
Living people
Australian male water polo players
Olympic water polo players of Australia
Water polo players at the 1992 Summer Olympics
Australian water polo coaches